The 2002 Australian GT Production Car Championship was a CAMS sanctioned motor racing title for drivers of Group 3E Series Production Cars. Entries competed in the following five classes:
 Class A : GT Performance Cars
 Class B : Sports Touring Cars
 Class C : V8 Touring Cars
 Class D : 6 Cylinder Touring Cars
 Class E : 4 Cylinder Touring Cars

Class A cars contested an eight round series with three races per round, with the exception of the first round which was staged over two races.
 Round 1, Adelaide Parklands Circuit, South Australia, 16 & 17 March
 Round 2, Symmons Plains International Raceway, Tasmania, 7 April
 Round 3, Oran Park, New South Wales, 5 May
 Round 4, Winton Motor Raceway, Victoria, 23 June
 Round 5, Queensland Raceway, Ipswich, Queensland, 14 July
 Round 6, Wakefield Park, New South Wales, 11 August
 Round 7, Phillip Island Grand Prix Circuit, Victoria, 22 September
 Round 8, Surfers Paradise Street Circuit, Queensland, 24 & 26 October

Class B, C, D & E cars contested an eight round series with two races per round
 Round 1, Adelaide Parklands Circuit, South Australia, 16 & 17 March
 Round 2, Symmons Plains International Raceway, Tasmania, 7 April
 Round 3, Oran Park, New South Wales, 5 May
 Round 4, Winton Motor Raceway, Victoria, 23 June
 Round 5, Queensland Raceway, Ipswich, Queensland, 14 July
 Round 6, Wakefield Park, New South Wales, 11 August
 Round 7, Sandown International Motor Raceway, Victoria, 7 September
 Round 8, Phillip Island Grand Prix Circuit, Victoria, 22 September

Category Managers "PROCAR Australia" promoted the two series as separate entities however CAMS recognises Brett Peters, the winner of the GT Permormance class, as the overall 2002 Australian GT Production Car Championship winner.

Results

GT Performance

GT Production

Class Awards

References

External links
 2002 Race Results Archive Retrieved from www.natsoft.biz on 14 March 2009
 2002 PROCAR Image Galleries Retrieved from web.archive.org on 14 March 2009

Australian GT Production Car Championship
GT Production Car Championship
Procar Australia